Peter Dudley (21 June 1935 – 20 October 1983) was an English character actor best known for his role as Bert Tilsley in the ITV television series Coronation Street; a role he played continuously from 1979 until his death in 1983.

Early life and career
As a child, Dudley harboured a desire to become an actor, but after leaving school, he began his working life as a doffer in a local mill—but this job lasted only two days. He then took a job in a grocer's shop before he joined the Bolton Hippodrome where he stayed for six months. He then worked as a window dresser and a salesman before doing his national service with the army.

After leaving the army, Dudley returned to acting with the Oldham Repertory Company and at the University Theatre in Manchester. He also became a leading actor with Manchester's Library Theatre Company. He made his first appearances on Coronation Street in the late 1960s, first playing a waiter and later a delivery man. He appeared in a small part as a lorry driver in the film The Ragman's Daughter (1972) and on television in The Siege of Golden Hill (1975), Against The Crowd, Have Bird Will Travel, Here I Stand, Shabby Tiger, Strangers and Crown Court. He also played two further small roles in Coronation Street during this time, as Duggie Bowker in 1973 and as Donald Anderson in 1978. After these bit parts, he was eventually cast as series regular Bert Tilsley, appearing from January 1979 onwards. Bert was the husband of Ivy Tilsley (played by Lynne Perrie) and father of Brian Tilsley (played by Christopher Quinten).

Court case and decline in health
Dudley was openly gay to the cast and crew of Coronation Street. In 1981, he was observed exposing himself to another man in a public toilet in Didsbury, and was arrested and charged with importuning. Following the arrest, Coronation Street producer Bill Podmore allowed him to continue to appear in the series. Dudley pleaded guilty and was fined £200. Some months later, he was charged again with gross indecency for an alleged similar offence, though this time he claimed he was not guilty and had been set up by the police. He chose to be tried in the Crown Court rather than a magistrates' court, which prolonged the affair and made it highly public. A jury failed to agree on a verdict and the judge ordered a retrial. The strain became too much and Dudley suffered a stroke, losing much of the use of his left side, and briefly his speech. The retrial was postponed but the case kept open.

Dudley spent time in physiotherapy but wanted to continue to act in Coronation Street, so a storyline of Bert being injured in a compressor explosion in Brian's garage was devised. Although his disabilities were largely hidden, it was clear the actor was unwell. Dudley was then written out of the show in mid 1983 so that he could prepare for his pending retrial, but before the second trial was heard, he suffered two heart attacks and a further stroke. He died on 20 October 1983 in Salford Royal Hospital, at the age of 48. He was cremated at Blackley Crematorium, Manchester on 25 October 1983. Ironically, Dudley's co-star Lynne Perrie, who played his screen wife, was also briefly admitted to the same hospital after experiencing chest pains the day before he died. Later, upon learning of his death, she was said to be "devastated". Co-star Eileen Derbyshire, who played Emily Bishop in the series, stated she would remember Dudley as "full of vitality, fun and laughter, despite his personal problems."

References
corrie.net

External links

1935 births
1983 deaths
English male soap opera actors
Male actors from Manchester
English gay actors
People prosecuted under anti-homosexuality laws
20th-century English male actors
20th-century English LGBT people